Boliver Sarfo Owusu (born 13 May 1997) is a Ghanaian footballer who currently plays as a goalkeeper for Ghana Premier League side WAFA.

Career 
Owusu started his career with West African Football Academy in January 2019. He made the squad for the 2019–20 season however he did not make any appearance as he remained the back up to Sabi Acquah Ferdinand. He made his debut during the during the 2020–21 season, keeping the post in a match against Legon Cities on 8 January 2021. The match ended in a 1–0 loss to WAFA.

References

External links 

 

Living people
1997 births
Association football goalkeepers
Ghanaian footballers
West African Football Academy players
Ghana Premier League players
20th-century Ghanaian people
21st-century Ghanaian people